Je suis Karl is a German drama film directed by Christian Schwochow from a screenplay by Thomas Wendrich. The film stars Luna Wedler and Jannis Niewöhner.

The film had its worldwide premiere at the 71st Berlin International Film Festival.

Cast
The cast include:
 Luna Wedler as Maxi
 Jannis Niewöhner as Karl
 Milan Peschel
 Elizaveta Maximova as Isabel
 Marlon Boess as Pankraz
 Veronika Bellova as Emotions in Audience
 Aziz Dyab
 Daniela Hirsh as Guilia
 Melanie Fouche as Ines Baier
 Hendrik Voss as Eric

Release
On February 11, 2021, Berlinale announced that the film would have its worldwide premiere at the 71st Berlin International Film Festival in the Berlinale Special section, in March 2021.

References

External links
 

German drama films
Films directed by Christian Schwochow
2021 drama films
2020s German-language films